Bassendean may refer to:

Bassendean, Western Australia, suburb of Perth, Western Australia
Town of Bassendean, local government district in Western Australia
Electoral district of Bassendean, Western Australia
Bassendean, Scottish Borders, country house in Scotland